4150 Starr, provisional designation , is a stony Florian asteroid from the inner regions of the asteroid belt, approximately 7 kilometers in diameter. It was discovered by American astronomer Brian Skiff at Lowell's Anderson Mesa Station on 31 August 1984. It was named after musician Ringo Starr.

Orbit and classification 

Starr is a member of the Flora family, one of the largest groups of stony asteroids in the main-belt. It orbits the Sun in the inner main-belt at a distance of 1.9–2.6 AU once every 3 years and 4 months (1,219 days). Its orbit has an eccentricity of 0.17 and an inclination of 3° with respect to the ecliptic. The first observation was made at the U.S. Goethe Link Observatory in 1957, extending the asteroid's observation arc by 27 years prior to its discovery.

Physical characteristics 

Starr has been characterized as a common S-type asteroid by PanSTARRS photometric survey.

Rotation period 

According to the space-based survey by the NEOWISE mission of NASA's Wide-field Infrared Survey Explorer, Starr measures 6.6 and 6.9 kilometers in diameter and its surface has an albedo of 0.258 and 0.277, respectively, while the Collaborative Asteroid Lightcurve Link (CALL) assumes an albedo of 0.24 – derived from 8 Flora, the family's largest member and namesake – and calculates a diameter of 7.5 kilometers with an absolute magnitude of 12.8.

Diameter and albedo 

Several rotational lightcurves of Starr were obtained from photometric observations. An unpublished lightcurve by Kryszczynska from November 2011, has been rated best by CALL. It gave a rotation period of  hours and a brightness variation of 0.20 in magnitude.

Naming 

This minor planet was named after Richard Starkey (born 1940), better known as Ringo Starr, the drummer of The Beatles. He joined the English rock band in 1962, replacing its former drummer Pete Best. Ringo has released various albums in his solo career and also acted in several movies. The official naming citation was published by the Minor Planet Center on 10 April 1990. The minor planets 8749 Beatles, 4147 Lennon, 4148 McCartney and 4149 Harrison were named after the band and its three other members.

Notes

References

External links 
 Asteroid Lightcurve Database (LCDB), query form (info )
 Dictionary of Minor Planet Names, Google books
 Asteroids and comets rotation curves, CdR – Observatoire de Genève, Raoul Behrend
 Discovery Circumstances: Numbered Minor Planets (1)-(5000) – Minor Planet Center
 
 

004150
Discoveries by Brian A. Skiff
Named minor planets
Ringo Starr
19840831